María Pia van Oordt López (born 18 March 2000) is a Peruvian sailor. She and Diana Tudela competed for Peru at the 2020 Summer Olympics in the 49er FX event.

Notes

References

External links
 
 

2000 births
Living people
Peruvian female sailors (sport)
Olympic sailors of Peru
Sailors at the 2020 Summer Olympics – 49er FX
Place of birth missing (living people)